The 1982 Brown Bears football team was an American football team that represented Brown University during the 1982 NCAA Division I-AA football season. Brown tied for fourth place in the Ivy League. 

In their sixth season under head coach John Anderson, the Bears compiled a 5–5 record but were outscored 214 to 228. B. Barrett, D. Nelson and K. Powers were the team captains. 

The Bears' 3–4 conference record earned them part of a four-way tie for fourth place in the Ivy League standings. They were outscored 169 to 161 by Ivy opponents. 

This was Brown's first year in Division I-AA, after having competed in the top-level Division I-A and its predecessors since 1878.

Brown played its home games at Brown Stadium in Providence, Rhode Island.

Schedule

References

Brown
Brown Bears football seasons
Brown Bears football